AP-2 complex subunit mu is a protein that in humans is encoded by the AP2M1 gene.

Function 

This gene encodes a subunit of the heterotetrameric coat assembly protein complex 2 (AP2), which belongs to the adaptor complexes medium subunits family. The encoded protein is required for the activity of a vacuolar ATPase, which is responsible for proton pumping occurring in the acidification of endosomes and lysosomes. The encoded protein may also play an important role in regulating the intracellular trafficking and function of CTLA-4 protein. Two transcript variants encoding different isoforms have been found for this gene.

Interactions 

AP2M1 has been shown to interact with CTLA-4 and Alpha-1B adrenergic receptor.

References

Further reading

External links